Claudine de Brosse (1450–1513), was a Duchess Consort of Savoy; married in 1485 to Philip II, Duke of Savoy.

She was a daughter of Jean II de Brosse and Nicole de Châtillon.

Issue:

 Charles III (1486–1553) who succeeded his half-brother as Duke of Savoy
 Louis (1488–1502)
 Philip (1490–1533), duke of Nemours
 Assolone (1494)
 Giovanni Amedeo (1495)
 Philiberta (1498–1524), married Julian II di Medici (1479–1516), duke of Nemours

Ancestry

References

1450 births
1513 deaths
Duchesses of Savoy
15th-century French people
15th-century French women
16th-century French people
16th-century French women